Guglielmo di Antonio de' Pazzi, Lord of Civitella (Florence, 6 August 1437 - 6 July 1516) was an Italian nobleman, banker and politician, husband of Bianca de' Medici, sister of the Lord of Florence Lorenzo the Magnificent.

Biography 

Guglielmo was born in Florence on 6 August 1437. He was one of nine children (three sons and six daughters) of Antonio di Andrea de' Pazzi and his wife Nicolosa degli Alessandri. 

In August 1459 he married Bianca de' Medici (d. 1488), a member of the most powerful and wealthy family in the city and daughter of the Lord of Florence Piero de' Medici and sister of Lorenzo the Magnificent. Thanks to the marriage, Guglielmo obtained many important offices. He was Priore of Liberty (1467), VIII of Balia and Guardia (1469), Officer of Monte (1471) and Mint Consul (1475). 

In 1478 relations between the Medici and Pazzi had deteriorated for political, economic and personal reasons. Jacopo and Francesco de' Pazzi (Guglielmo's uncle and brother) organized the Pazzi Conspiracy to kill Lorenzo and his brother Giuliano de' Medici. Giuliano died but Lorenzo survived. With the support of the city, Lorenzo retaliated by killing or exiling all male members of the Pazzi family, and forbidding any Pazzi women who chose to stay in Florence from marrying. Finally he condemned the Pazzi to damnatio memoriae. Guglielmo did not take part in the conspiracy, but was himself exiled and banned from politics for 15 years. His wife and children went with him. However, his daughters were exempt from the ban on marrying. His wife Bianca died in exile in 1488. 

In 1495 he held political offices in Tortona and was ambassador to Charles VIII of France. In 1497 and 1498 he held offices in Mugello and Scarperia. In 1501 he fought for Florence against Pisa and in 1502 he was Commissioner in Val di Chiana and Arezzo. In 1513 he became Gonfaloniere, the highest Florentine office. 

Later he bought the fiefdom of Civitella in Romagna and became Lord of Civitella. 

He died on 6 July 1516.

Issue 
Bianca and Guglielmo had sixteen children, nine sons and seven daughters: 

 Antonio de' Pazzi (1460), died as an infant

 Giovanna de' Pazzi, married Tommaso Monaldi in 1471

 Contessina de' Pazzi, married Giuliano Salviati in 1476

 Antonio de' Pazzi (1462-1528), ambassador and politician, Gonfaloniere di Giustizia in 1521, second Lord of Civitella

 Alessandra de' Pazzi (1465), married Bartolomeo Buondelmonti in 1486

 Cosimo de' Pazzi (1466-1513), archbishop of Florence from 1508 until his death

 Piero de' Pazzi (1468), died as an infant

 Lorenzo Alessandro de' Pazzi, (1470-1535) merchant, patron of the arts and latinist

 Cosa de' Pazzi, married Francesco di Luca Capponi

 Renato de' Pazzi, goldsmith merchant

 Lorenzo de' Pazzi, politician and ambassador

 Luigia de' Pazzi, married Folco di Edoardo Portinari in 1494

 Maddalena de' Pazzi, married Ormanozzo Deti in 1497

 Alessandro de' Pazzi (1483-1530) ambassador, literate and greekist

 Lucrezia de' Pazzi, married Cattani di Diacceto, and then a member of Martelli family (1500)

 Giuliano de' Pazzi (1486-1517), doctor of law, abbot and canon of the Metropolitan of Florence

References 

1437 births
1516 deaths
Italian bankers
Pazzi family
15th-century Italian businesspeople
15th-century people of the Republic of Florence
Italian politicians
Nobility from Florence